Gazan Band (also Romanized as Gazān Band) is a village in Sina Rural District, in the Central District of Varzaqan County, East Azerbaijan Province, Iran. At the 2006 census, its population was 255, in 51 families.

References 

Towns and villages in Varzaqan County